The 2018–2020 CSV Beach Volleyball Continental Cup were a beach volleyball double-gender event. Teams from South American countries were split into groups of four, where an elimination bracket determined the 2 teams to advance to the next stage from the sub-zones. The winners of the event qualified for the 2020 Summer Olympics.

Phase 1

Men

Pool A
Pool A was contested in Brasília, Brazil.

 Third place:  3–1 

 qualified for final phase.  qualified to phase 3.  qualified to phase 2.

Pool B
Pool B was contested in Mar del Plata, Argentina.

 qualified for final phase.  qualified for third phase.

Pool C
Pool B was contested in Coquimbo, Chile.

 Third place:  0–3  French Guiana

 qualified for final phase.  and  French Guiana qualified to phase 2.

Women

Pool A
Pool A was contested in Brasília, Brazil.

 qualified to third round.

Pool B
Pool B was contested in Coquimbo, Chile.

 Third place:  3–0  French Guiana

 qualified for phase 3.  and  qualified to phase 2.

Pool C
Pool C was contested in Asunción, Paraguay.

 Third place:  0–3 

 qualified for third round.  and  qualified to phase 2.

Phase 2

Men
 Phase 2 was contested in Portoviejo, Ecuador.

  qualified for third phase.

Women
 Phase 2 was contested in Montevideo, Uruguay.

  qualified for third phase.

Phase 3

Men

|}

|}

|}

  took third place.

|}

  took first place.
  took second place

References

External links
Official website

Continental Beach Volleyball Cup
2018 in beach volleyball
2019 in beach volleyball
2020 in beach volleyball